The Blue Flag is a World War I song written and composed by Carrie Jacobs-Bond. 

The song was published in 1917 by The Bond Shop in Chicago, Il. The sheet music cover, illustrated by Artist Press, depicts the flag of the 21st Infantry Regiment of the U.S. Army.

References

Bibliography
Parker, Bernard S. World War I Sheet Music 1. Jefferson: McFarland & Company, Inc., 2007. .

1917 songs
Songs of World War I
Songs written by Carrie Jacobs-Bond